Shay Fields (born June 22, 1996) is an American wide receiver who is currently playing for the Panasonic Impulse, of the X-League. He played college football at Colorado, and was signed by the Washington Redskins as an undrafted free agent in 2018.

College career
Fields ranked second in Buffaloes history in receiving yards (2,552), third in receptions (190) and tied for third in receiving touchdowns (21).

Professional career

Washington Redskins
Fields was signed by the Washington Redskins as an undrafted free agent on May 2, 2018. 
On September 1, 2018, he was waived for final roster cuts before the start of the 2018 season.

Denver Broncos
On December 11, 2018, Fields was signed to the Denver Broncos practice squad.

San Diego Fleet (AAF)
On January 10, 2019, Fields signed with the San Diego Fleet of the AAF. However, he was placed on injured reserve before the start of the regular season. He was waived on February 23, 2019. He was added to the team's rights list and re-signed to a contract on March 19. He was activated to the roster on March 20.

Calgary Stampeders
After the AAF suspended operations, Fields signed with the Calgary Stampeders of the Canadian Football League on April 29, 2019.

Panasonic Impulse

In 2021, Fields signed with the Panasonic Impulse in the X-League in Japan. 

Vegas Knight Hawks (IFL) 

On May 4 2022, Fields signed with the Vegas Knight Hawks in the Indoor Football League.

References

External links
Colorado Buffaloes bio

1996 births
Living people
American football wide receivers
Colorado Buffaloes football players
Denver Broncos players
People from Bellflower, California
Players of American football from California
Washington Redskins players
San Diego Fleet players
Sportspeople from Los Angeles County, California
Calgary Stampeders players
American expatriate sportspeople in Japan
American expatriate players of American football